The Lochdon Free Church is a place of worship of the Free Church of Scotland in Lochdon on the Isle of Mull, Scotland. The church was built in 1852.

References
 Jo Currie. Mull: the island and its people (Birlinn 2000) 
 Willie Orr. Discovering Argyll; Mull & Iona John Donald Publishers Ltd (Edinburgh 1990)

External links 
 The chapel on www.mull-historical-society.co.uk
 The chapel on Google Streetview

Churches completed in 1852
Churches in Argyll and Bute
Buildings and structures on the Isle of Mull
19th-century Presbyterian churches
19th-century churches in the United Kingdom
1843 establishments in Scotland